This is a bibliography of literature treating the topic of criticism of Christianity, sorted by source publication and the author's last name.

Books by author

A–L 

 John M. Allegro, The Dead Sea Scrolls and the Christian Myth
  Baron d'Holbach, Christianity Unveiled
 Dan Barker, godless (Ulysses Press 2008)
Christian Piatt, Banned Questions about Bible
Christian Piatt, Banned Questions about Jesus
Christian Piatt, Banned Questions about Christians
 Blavatsky, H.P., Isis Unveiled
 R. Carrier, Not the Impossible Faith (Lulu 2009)
 Tim Callahan,  Secret origins of the Bible  (Millennium Press 2002)
Chinua Achebe, Things Fall Apart
 Christian Missionary Activities Enquiry Committee (Madhya Pradesh, India), and Sita Ram Goel. 1998. Vindicated by time: the Niyogi Committee report on Christian missionary activities.
 Richard Dawkins,  The greatest show on earth,  (Blackswan 2007)
 Richard Dawkins  The God Delusion
 Richard Dawkins, The Blind Watchmaker
Dayananda, S., & Bharadwaja, C. (1915). Light of truth: Or an English translation of the Satyarth Prakash, the well-known work. Allahabad: Arya Pratinidhi Sabha. (Chapter 14)
 Daniel Dennett Breaking the Spell: Religion as a Natural Phenomenon
 Freeman, C. The Closing of the Western Mind
 David and Solomon, by I. Finkelstein and N. Asherman (Freepress 2006)
 The Jesus Mysteries, by T. Freke and P. Gandy (Element 1999)
 The Jesus Puzzle, by Earl Doherty (Age of Reason Publications, 1999)
 Sigmund Freud, Civilization and its discontents 
 Sigmund Freud, Future of an illusion 
Albert Einstein  Out of my later years and the World as I see it
Ellens, J. Harold (2002). The Destructive Power of Religion: Violence in Judaism, Christianity and Islam. Praeger Publishers. .
Elst, K. (1993). Psychology of prophetism: A secular look at the Bible. 
Gage, M.J. (1997). Woman, church and state: A historical account of the status of woman through the Christian ages, with reminiscences of the matriarchate.  
Goel, S. R. (1986). Papacy: Its doctrine and history. 
Goel, Sita Ram. 1994. Jesus Christ: an artifice for aggression. 
Goel, Sita Ram. 2009. Catholic ashrams: sannyasins or swindlers, with new appendices.
Goel, Sita Ram. 2016. History of Hindu-Christian encounters, AD 304 to 1996.
Jacolliot, L. (2014). The Bible in India. New Delhi: Christian World Imprints. 
Karlheinz Deschner,  Criminal History of Christianity
 Sam Harris, Letter to a Christian Nation
 Harris, Sam. The End of Faith
Hitchens, C. (2013). The missionary position: Mother Teresa in theory and in practice.
 Christopher Hitchens, God Is Not Great 
 Christopher Hitchens, The Portable Atheist
Max Jammer, Einstein and Religion
 Timothy Freke and Peter Gandy The Jesus Mysteries  (Element 1999)
 Collins, John J.  Does the Bible Justify Violence? Minneapolis: Fortress, 2004.
 Gary Greenberg 101 myths of the Bible  (Sourcebooks 2000)
 Kenneth Humphreys, Jesus never existed  (Iconoclast Press, 2005)
 Lea, Henry Charles. 1961. The Inquisition of the Middle Ages. Abridged. New York: Macmillan.
 The Christian Delusion, edited by John W. Loftus, foreword by Dan Barker (Prometheus Books, 2010)
 The End of Christianity, edited by John W. Loftus (Prometheus Books, 2011)
 John W. Loftus, Why I Became an Atheist: A Former Preacher Rejects Christianity (Prometheus Books, 2008)

M–Z 

 Murdock, D.M. (2007). Who Was Jesus? Fingerprints of The Christ. Stellar House Publishing. .
 Michel Onfray Atheist Manifesto
 Bekkenkamp, Jonneke and Sherwood, Yvonne, ed. Sanctified Aggression. Legacies of Biblical and Postbiblical Vocabularies of Violence. London/New York: T. & T. Clark International, 2003.
 Hiroshi Obayashi, Death and Afterlife, Perspectives of World Religions
 MacMullen, Ramsay, 1989  "Christianizing the Roman Empire: AD 100–400"
 MacMullen, Ramsay, 1997, "Christianity and Paganism in the Fourth to Eighth Centuries"
 Magnus Magnusson  BC The archaeology of the Bible lands (Bodley Head 1977)
 Mason, Carol. 2002. Killing for Life: The Apocalyptic Narrative of Pro-Life Politics. Ithaca: Cornell University Press.
 McTernan, Oliver J. 2003. Violence in God's name: religion in an age of conflict. Orbis Books.
 Sharan, I., The myth of Saint Thomas and the Mylapore Shiva Temple.  (2010).
 Thiery, Daniel E. Polluting the Sacred: Violence, Faith and the Civilizing of Parishioners in Late Medieval England.  Leiden: Brill, 2009.
 Thomas Paine, The Age of Reason (1794–1807)
 Mark Twain, Letters from the Earth
 Victor J. Stenger God: The Failed Hypothesis
 Zeskind, Leonard. 1987. The 'Christian Identity' Movement [booklet]. Atlanta, Georgia: Center for Democratic Renewal/Division of Church and Society, National Council of Churches.
Friedrich Nietzsche,  The Antichrist
 Joseph McCabe A Rationalist Encyclopaedia: A book of reference on religion, philosophy, ethics and science, Gryphon Books (1971).
Rajiv Malhotra (2011), Breaking India: Western Interventions in Dravidian and Dalit Faultlines (Publisher: Amaryllis)
Catherine Nixey, The Darkening Age: The Christian Destruction of the Classical World
Panikkar, K. M. (1959). Asia and Western dominance: A survey of the Vasco Da Gama epoch of Asian history. London: Allen & Unwin. 
Panikkar, K. M. (1997). Malabar and the Portuguese. 
Priolkar, A. K., & Dellon, G. (2008). The Goa inquisition: Being a quatercentenary commemoration study of the inquisition in India. Panaji: Rajhauns Vitaran. 
 Robert M. Price, The case against the case for Christ  (American atheist press 2010)
 Robert M. Price, The reason driven life (Prometheus Books, 2006)
 Carl Sagan, The Varieties of Scientific Experience: A Personal View of the Search for God
 Sandhya Jain, Evangelical Intrusions – Tripura, a case study
 Herman Philipse, God in the Age of Science?
 Michael Martin, The Case Against Christianity 
 Patrick McNamara, Where God and Science Meet [Three Volumes]: How Brain and Evolutionary Studies Alter Our Understanding of Religion
 Bertrand Russell, Why I am not a Christian and other essays
 The encyclopedia of Biblical errancy, by C. Dennis McKinsey (Prometheus Books, 1995)
 Shourie, Arun. (2006). Harvesting our souls: Missionaries, their design, their claims. New Delhi: Rupa. 
 Shourie, Arun. (2006). Missionaries in India: Continuities, changes, dilemmas. New Delhi: Rupa.
 Shourie, Arun. Arun Shourie and his Christian critic. (1995). 
 Spinoza, Baruch, Tractatus Theologico-Politicus (TTP) (1670)
Swarup, Ram (1992). Hindu view of Christianity and Islam.
Swarup, Ram. (1992). Hinduism vis-à-vis Christianity and Islam. 
Swarup, Ram. (1995). Pope John Paul II on Eastern religions and yoga: A Hindu Buddhist rejoinder.  
Swarup, Ram. (2015). Hinduism and monotheistic religions.
Vedantham, T. R., Swarup, R., & Goel, S. R. (1983). Christianity, an imperialist ideology.  
Venkat, K., Humphreys, K., & Isaac, C. I. (2014). What every Hindu should know about Christianity.
Vivekananda Kendra Prakashan Trust (Chennai, India). (2007). Expressions of Christianity: With a focus on India. Chennai: Vivekananda Kendra Prakashan Trust. 
 The Historical Evidence for Jesus, by G. A. Wells (Prometheus Books, 1988)

References

See also
 Bibliography of books critical of Islam
 Bibliography of books critical of Judaism
 Bibliography of books critical of Mormonism
 Bibliography of books critical of Scientology
 List of apologetic works
 List of Christian apologetic works
 List of Islamic apologetic works

Christianity-related controversies
 
Bibliographies of subcultures
Anti-Christian sentiment
Criticism of Christianity
 
Lists of books about religion